Sven Felix Kellerhoff (born 1971) is a German historian, journalist and author who specialises in the history of the Nazi era.

Education and career
Kellerhoff was born in 1971 in Stuttgart, Germany. Since 2003, Kellerhoff has been the Chief Editor of Contemporary and Cultural History at Die Welt. Prior to Die Welt, he worked at the Berliner Morgenpost and Berliner Zeitung.

Non-fiction author
Kellerhoff has published more than twenty book titles during his career. Among his works is a recent history of the Nazi Party, published in 2017 as Die NSDAP: eine Partei und ihre Mitglieder ("The NSDAP: A Party and its Members"). Among other sources, Kellerhoff utilised the research conducted by American sociologist Theodore Abel. While in Germany on a research project in 1934, Abel launched a competition in cooperation with the Nazi Party to collect life stories of members who had joined the party prior to 1933. He collected 683 biographical sketches, which formed the basis of his report How Hitler Came to Power.

Publications

In German
 Deutsche Legenden. Vom ‚Dolchstoß‘ und anderen Mythen der Geschichte. With . Links Verlag, Berlin, 2002, . 
 Attentäter – Mit einer Kugel die Welt verändern. Böhlau Verlag, Köln, 2003, .
 Als die Tage zu Nächten wurden – Berliner Schicksale im Bombenkrieg.  (Eds.), Berlin Story Verlag, 2003, .
 Hitlers Berlin. Geschichte einer Hassliebe. be.bra Verlag, Berlin 2005, .
 Berlin unterm Hakenkreuz. Berlin Edition, Berlin 2006, .
 Mythos Führerbunker. Hitlers letzter Unterschlupf. Berlin Story Verlag, Berlin 2006, .
 Gerüchte machen Geschichte. Folgenreiche Falschmeldungen im 20. Jahrhundert (with Lars-Broder Keil), Links Verlag, Berlin 2006, .
 Ortstermin Mitte – Auf Spurensuche in Berlins Innenstadt. Berlin Story Verlag, Berlin 2007, .
 Reichstagsbrand. Die Karriere eines Kriminalfalls. be.bra, Berlin 2008, .
 Die Fluchttunnel von Berlin. With , Propyläen, Berlin 2008, .
 "Kristallnacht": das Novemberpogrom 1938 und die Verfolgung der Berliner Juden 1924 bis 1945. Berlin-Story-Verlag, Berlin 2008, .
 Die Stasi und der Westen. Der Kurras-Komplex. Hoffmann und Campe, Hamburg 2010, .
 Aus der Geschichte lernen. In: Handbuch zur Aufarbeitung von Diktaturen. Ein Projekt im Rahmen der Deutsch-Tunesischen Transformationspartnerschaft „Contre l'oubli“. Hrsg. Auswärtiges Amt; Gedenkstätte Berlin-Hohenschönhausen. Nomos, Baden-Baden 2013, .
 Heimatfront. Der Untergang der heilen Welt – Deutschland im Ersten Weltkrieg. Quadriga Verlag, Köln 2014, .
 Hitlers Ende. Der Untergang im Führerbunker. Berlin-Story-Verlag, Berlin 2015, .
 «Mein Kampf». Die Karriere eines deutschen Buches. Klett-Cotta, Stuttgart 2015, . Ebook .
 Die NSDAP. Eine Partei und ihre Mitglieder. Klett-Cotta, Stuttgart 2017, .

In English

Further reading
Josef Schmid: "Die vermeintlich erste Darstellung der Geschichte der NSDAP - Sven Kellerhoffs Studie bietet keine neuen Einsichten". , December 2017

References

1971 births
Historians of World War II
German male non-fiction writers
20th-century German historians
20th-century German journalists
21st-century German journalists
German journalists
German male journalists
German newspaper journalists
Living people
Die Welt people